Santa Teresa del Carmelo is a seventeenth-century Roman Catholic Baroque-style church in Piacenza, Italy.

History
A church at the site, dedicated to the Holy Spirit, was administered by monks of the Umiliati order. In 1571, when the order was suppressed, the church became property of the bishopric. In 1627, the properties of the Umiliati were ceded to the Carmelite order. Starting in 1650, they began to erect the present church, dedicated to St Teresa of Ávila. Most of the work was completed by 1652. The church and adjacent monastery were suppressed in 1810, but re-opened in 1819 under the administration of the bishop. 

The interior decoration includes several chapels painted by Flemish artists such as Roberto De Longe (il Fiammingho) and by members of the Giovanni Battista Natali family, and the Brescian painter Giacomo Ceruti. In the second chapel to the right, De Longe painted a fresco of Saint Teresa and the child Jesus in an architectural niche by Giovanni Natali the younger. To the right of the choir is an altarpiece by Carlo Francesco Nuvolone. To the left of the sanctuary, there is a canvas depicting St Anthony of Padua by Francesco del Cairo.

It houses a bronze crucifix attributed to Francesco Algardi. Some of the quadrature decoration was completed by Giuseppe Turbini.

References

Roman Catholic churches in Piacenza
17th-century Roman Catholic church buildings in Italy
Baroque architecture in Piacenza
Roman Catholic churches completed in 1652
1650 establishments in Italy
1652 establishments in Italy